The Graphic of Australia was a weekly newspaper first published in Melbourne on January 21, 1916, with a cover price of one penny. Publication continued until issue number 106 on December 31, 1918. It was printed by Mitchell & Casey, and published by William Sydney McDermott at 25 Tattersall's Lane, Melbourne. Digitised issues are available at Trove.

References

External links
The Graphic of Australia (1916–1918) at Trove

Defunct newspapers published in Melbourne
Publications established in 1916
1916 establishments in Australia
1918 disestablishments in Australia